Henry B. Bogue (December 16, 1892 – February 1, 1985) was an American college football and basketball coach.
He served as the head basketball coach at Wilmington College, Ohio from 1920 to 1921.

References

External links
 Indiana Football Hall of Fame

1892 births
1985 deaths
Basketball coaches from Colorado
William Penn Statesmen football players
Wilmington Quakers football coaches
Wilmington Quakers men's basketball coaches
High school football coaches in Illinois
People from Henry County, Iowa
People from Prowers County, Colorado
Players of American football from Colorado